Kierulf is a surname. Notable people with the surname include:

Anders Kierulf, author of Smart Game Format
Anine Kierulf (born 1974),  Norwegian lawyer
Brian Kierulf, American songwriter and producer
Otto Richard Kierulf (1825–1897), Norwegian military officer, politician, and sports administrator